The shifted Gompertz distribution is the distribution of the larger of two independent random variables one of which has an exponential distribution with parameter  and the other has a Gumbel distribution with parameters  and . In its original formulation the distribution was expressed referring to the Gompertz distribution instead of the Gumbel distribution but, since the Gompertz distribution is a reverted Gumbel distribution, the labelling can be considered as accurate. It has been used as a model of adoption of innovations. It was proposed by Bemmaor (1994). Some of its statistical properties have been studied further by Jiménez and Jodrá (2009)
and Jiménez Torres (2014).

It has been used to predict the growth and decline of social networks and on-line services and shown to be superior to the Bass model and Weibull distribution (Bauckhage and Kersting 2014).

Specification

Probability density function

The probability density function of the shifted Gompertz distribution is:

The larger  is, the stronger the appeal and the larger  is, the smaller the propensity to adopt.

Hence:

When , the shifted Gompertz distribution reduces to an exponential distribution. When , the proportion of adopters is nil: the innovation is a complete failure. See Bemmaor and Zheng  for further analysis.

Cumulative distribution function

The cumulative distribution function of the shifted Gompertz distribution is:

Equivalently,

Properties 
It is more flexible than the Gumbel distribution. In the context of the diffusion of innovations, the effect of word of mouth (i.e., the previous adopters) on the likelihood to adopt decreases as the proportion of adopters increases. (For comparison, in the Bass model, the effect remains the same over time).

Shapes
The shifted Gompertz density function can take on different shapes depending on the values of the shape parameter :
  the probability density function has its mode at 0.
  the probability density function has its mode at
 
where  is the smallest root of 

which is

Related distributions 
When  is equal to one, the G/SG reduces to the Bass model (Bemmaor 1994). The three-parameter G/SG has been applied by Dover, Goldenberg and Shapira (2009) and Van den Bulte and Stremersch (2004) among others in the context of the diffusion of innovations. The model is discussed in Chandrasekaran and Tellis (2007).Similar to the shifted Gompertz distribution, the G/SG can either be represented according to the propensity-to-adopt paradigm or according to the innovation-imitation paradigm. The parameter  modifies the curvature of the hazard rate as expressed as a function of : when  is less than 0.5, it decreases to a minimum prior to increasing at an increasing rate as  increases, it is convex when  is less than one and larger or equal to 0.5, linear when  is equal to one, and concave when  is larger than one. Here are some special cases of the G/SG distribution in the case of homogeneity (across the population) with respect to the likelihood to adopt at a given time:

                          = Exponential
                          = Left-skewed two-parameter distribution
                           = Bass model
                          = Shifted Gompertz
  
with:

               

As the diffusion curve is all the more skewed as  becomes large, we expect  to decrease as the level of right-skew increases.

See also 
Gumbel distribution
Generalized extreme value distribution
Mixture model
Bass model
Gompertz distribution

References 

Continuous distributions